Weissert is a German-language surname. Notable people with the name include the following:

Augustus G. Weissert (1844–1923), US soldier
David Weissert (1913–1989), US politician
Ernst Weissert (1905–1981), German anthroposophist
Greg Weissert (born 1995), American baseball player

See also
Weissert, Nebraska

References

German-language surnames